Ethen Beavers is an American comic book artist from Modesto, CA.

Beavers' comic industry work includes titles as Justice League Unlimited, Teen Titans Go!, Legion of Super Heroes in the 31st Century, Six, Noble Causes: Distant Relatives #4, as well as pin ups in Savage Dragon #112 and Hellhounds #3.

He has also done logo design as well as freelance illustration for various advertising agencies. Beavers is also a storyboard artist for Warner Bros. Justice League Unlimited animated show on Cartoon Network. He now illustrates a series called NERDS by Michael Buckley. He also created comic art for George Lucas such as Clone Wars and Indiana Jones.

Mutation
In 2004, Beavers began working with writer George T. Singley on Mutation for Speakeasy Comics. Due to major complications with the now defunct Speakeasy Comics, neither writer nor artist received compensation for their work and the book was published months behind schedule. Several completed issues of the series never even saw the shelves of comics book stores.

Mutation was picked up by Markosia Enterprises and published (with the missing issues) in trade paperback format. 
"Beavers is indeed a student of Kirby and the Bruce Timm stable of artists. Beavers captures Kirby's frenetic motion and truly dynamic anatomy so that Mutation seems to hit bad guys, all imaginatively designed, save for the opening Kalibak-clone, off the pages. The women have that highly stylized hourglass figure so prevalent in Batman: the Animated Series, Superman and to a lesser extent Justice League. The blustery nature of the fights and the painfully hot female background players are in fact very sly clues to the surprise conclusion. " - Comics Bulletin

N.E.R.D.S.
In January 2009 Michael Buckley, a New York Times best seller, walked into a Brooklyn New York comic shop to hand pick an illustrator for his new book series N.E.R.D.S. Buckley and his creative director Chad Beckerman selected 10 candidates to submit to their editor as potential artists for the project. Out of that process, Beavers was selected as the illustrator for the N.E.R.D.S. book series. Four projects have been completed to date, N.E.R.D.S. (2009), M is for Mama's Boy (2010), The Cheerleaders of Doom (2011), and The Villain Virus (2012). Since the first installment, the N.E.R.D.S. series has gone on to become a New York Times best seller. Movie rights for the series were recently purchased by Sir Elton John. Commenting about Ethen's illustrations in the N.E.R.D.S. series Creative Director Chad W. Beckerman has said:

"Again this [is] a series that I always wanted as a kid. Nerds that are superhero spies, sold! But what really sells me is Ethen Beavers' insanely amazing illustrations that cover this book to create the world of NERDS."

Influences
Beavers’ influences include Jack Kirby, Alex Toth, Darwyn Cooke, Bruce Timm, Mike Mignola, and Steve Rude.

Selected bibliography
 DC Comics
 Justice League Unlimited #2, #7, #18
 Justice League Unlimited Vol. 1: United They Stand
 Justice League Unlimited Vol. 2: United They Stand
 Legion of Superheroes in the 31st Century #7, #9, #12, #18
 Image Comics
 Six (written by Michael Avon Oeming)
 Speakeasy Comis
 Mutation #1-3
Markosia Enterprises
 Mutation Volume 1
Dark Horse Comics
 Star Wars: Clone Wars Adventures Volume 7
 Indiana Jones Adventures Volume 1
 Indiana Jones Adventures Volume 2

References

Year of birth missing (living people)
Living people
American comics artists
People from Grants Pass, Oregon